The women's 4×100 metre medley relay event at the 1996 Summer Olympics took place on 24 July at the Georgia Tech Aquatic Center in Atlanta, United States.

Records
Prior to this competition, the existing world and Olympic records were as follows.

Results

Heats
Rule: The eight fastest teams advance to the final (Q).

Final

References

External links
 Official Report
 USA Swimming

Swimming at the 1996 Summer Olympics
1996 in women's swimming
Women's events at the 1996 Summer Olympics